The Lady from Shanghai is a 1947 American film noir directed by Orson Welles (uncredited) and starring Welles, his estranged wife Rita Hayworth, and Everett Sloane. It is based on the novel If I Die Before I Wake by Sherwood King.

Although it initially received mixed reviews, it has grown in stature over the years, and many critics have praised its set designs and camerawork. In 2018, the film was selected for preservation in the United States National Film Registry by the Library of Congress as being "culturally, historically, or aesthetically significant."

Plot
Irish sailor Michael O'Hara meets the beautiful blonde Elsa as she rides a horse-drawn coach in Central Park. Three hooligans waylay the coach. Michael rescues Elsa and escorts her home. Michael reveals he is a seaman and learns Elsa and her husband, disabled criminal defense attorney Arthur Bannister, are newly arrived in New York City from Shanghai. They are on their way to San Francisco via the Panama Canal. Michael, attracted to Elsa despite misgivings, agrees to sign on as an able seaman aboard Bannister's yacht.

They are joined on the boat by Bannister's partner, George Grisby, who proposes that Michael "murder" him in a plot to fake his own death. He promises Michael $5,000 and explains that since he would not really be dead and since there would be no corpse, Michael could not be convicted of murder (reflecting corpus delicti laws at the time). Michael agrees, intending to use the money to run away with Elsa. Grisby has Michael sign a confession.

On the night of the crime, Sydney Broome, a private investigator who has been following Elsa on her husband's orders, confronts Grisby. Broome has learned of Grisby's plan to murder Bannister, frame Michael, and escape by pretending to have also been murdered. Grisby shoots Broome and leaves him for dead. Unaware of what has happened, Michael proceeds with the night's arrangement and sees Grisby off on a motorboat before shooting a gun into the ground to draw attention to himself. Meanwhile, Broome, mortally wounded but still alive, asks Elsa for help. He warns her that Grisby intends to kill her husband.

Michael makes a phone call to Elsa, but finds Broome on the other end of the line. Broome warns Michael that Grisby was setting him up. Michael rushes to Bannister's office in time to see Bannister is alive, but that the police are removing Grisby's body from the premises. The police find evidence implicating Michael, including his confession, and take him away.

At trial, Bannister acts as Michael's attorney. He feels he can win the case if Michael pleads justifiable homicide. During the trial, the incompetent judge quickly loses control of the proceedings. Bannister learns of his wife's relationship with Michael. He ultimately takes pleasure in his suspicion that they will lose the case. Bannister also indicates that he knows the real killer's identity. Before the verdict, Michael escapes by feigning a suicide attempt (swallowing pain relief pills Bannister takes for his disability), causing a commotion in which he slips out of the building with the jury for another case. Elsa follows and she and Michael hide in a Chinatown theater. Elsa calls some Chinese friends to meet her. As Michael and Elsa wait and pretend to watch the show, Michael realizes that she killed Grisby. Michael passes out from the pills he took just as Elsa's Chinese friends arrive; they carry the unconscious Michael to an empty fun house. When he wakes, he realizes that Grisby and Elsa had been planning to murder Bannister and frame him for the crime, but that Broome's involvement ruined the scheme and that Elsa had to kill Grisby for her own protection.

The film features a unique climactic shootout in a hall of mirrors involving a multitude of false and real mirrored images in the Magic Mirror Maze, in which Elsa is mortally wounded and Bannister is killed. Heartbroken, and ignoring Elsa's pleas to save her life, Michael leaves presuming that the events which have unfolded since the trial will clear him of any crimes. He contemplates, "Maybe I'll live so long that I'll forget her. Maybe I'll die trying."

Cast

Production
In the summer of 1946, Welles was directing Around the World, a musical stage adaptation of the Jules Verne novel Around the World in Eighty Days, with a comedic and ironic book by Welles, incidental music and songs by Cole Porter, and production by Mike Todd, who would later produce the successful film version with David Niven. When Todd pulled out from the lavish and expensive production, Welles financed it. When he ran out of money and urgently needed $55,000 to release costumes that were being held, he convinced Columbia Pictures president Harry Cohn to send him the money to continue the show and in exchange Welles promised to write, produce and direct a film for Cohn for no further fee.

As Welles told it, on the spur of the moment, he suggested the film be based on a book that he happened to see in front of him during his call with Cohn, one a girl in the theatre box office was reading at the time. Welles had never read it. However, according to the daughter of William Castle, it was her father who had purchased the film adaptation rights for the novel and who then asked Welles to pitch it to Cohn, with Castle hoping to receive the directoral assignment himself. She described her father as greatly respecting Welles' talents, but feeling nonetheless disappointed at being relegated to serve merely as Welles' assistant director on the film.

The Lady from Shanghai began filming on 2 October 1946, and originally finished filming on 27 February 1947, with studio-ordered retakes continuing through March 1947—but it was not released in the U.S. until 9 June 1948. Cohn strongly disliked Welles' rough cut, particularly what he considered to be a confusing plot and lack of close-ups (Welles had deliberately avoided these, as a stylistic device), and was not in sympathy with Welles' Brechtian use of irony and black comedy, especially in a farcical courtroom scene. He also objected to the appearance of the film. Welles had aimed for documentary-style authenticity by shooting the film almost entirely on location (making it one of the first major Hollywood pictures to be shot in this way) in Acapulco, Pie de la Cuesta, Sausalito and San Francisco), and by using primarily long takes, while Cohn preferred the more tightly controlled look of footage lit and shot in a studio. The release of the film was delayed due to Cohn's order for extensive editing and reshoots. Whereas Welles had delivered his cut of the film on time and under budget, the reshoots Welles was ordered to do meant that the film ended up over budget by a third, contributing to the director's reputation for going over budget. Once the reshoots were over, the heavy editing ordered by Cohn took over a year to complete; editor Viola Lawrence cut about an hour from Welles' rough cut.

Welles was appalled at the musical score, and he was particularly aggrieved by the cuts in the climactic confrontation scene in an amusement park funhouse at the end of the film. Intended as a climactic tour-de-force of editing and production design, the scene was cut to less than three minutes out of an intended running time of twenty minutes. As with many of the films over which Welles did not have control over the final cut, the missing footage has not been found and is presumed to have been destroyed. Surviving production stills show elaborate and expensive sets that were built for the sequence and which were entirely cut from the film.

Welles cast his wife Rita Hayworth as Elsa and caused a good deal of controversy when he instructed her to cut her long red hair and bleach it blonde for the role. "Orson was trying something new with me, but Harry Cohn wanted The Image—The Image he was gonna make me 'til I was 90," Rita Hayworth recalled. "The Lady from Shanghai was a very good picture. So what does Harry Cohn say when he sees it? 'He's ruined you—he cut your hair off!'"

The film was considered a disaster in the U.S. at the time of its release, although the closing shootout in a hall of mirrors has since become one of the touchstones of film noir. Not long after the film's release, Welles and Hayworth finalized their divorce. A remake of the film came close to production at the turn of the century from a screenplay written by Jeff Vintar, based both on Welles's script and the original pulp novel, produced by John Woo and Terence Chang, and starring Brendan Fraser, who wanted Michael Douglas and Catherine Zeta-Jones to co-star. Although the screenplay was considered highly successful, and Fraser was coming off the highly praised Gods and Monsters, the project was abandoned when the head of Sony Pictures, Amy Pascal, decided to concentrate on teen films.

Filming locations

In addition to the Columbia Pictures studios, the film was partly shot on location in San Francisco. It features the Sausalito waterfront and Lee Kahn's Valhalla waterfront bar and cafe, the front, interior, and a courtroom scene of the old Kearny Street Hall of Justice, and shots of Welles running across Portsmouth Square, escaping to a long scene in a theater in Chinatown, then the Steinhart Aquarium in Golden Gate Park, and Whitney's Playland-at-the-Beach amusement park at Ocean Beach for the hall of mirrors scene, for which interiors were shot on a soundstage.

Other scenes were filmed in Acapulco. The yacht , on which many scenes take place, was owned by actor Errol Flynn, who skippered the yacht in between takes and can also be seen in the background in one scene at a cantina in Acapulco.

Critical reaction
William Brogdon of Variety found the script to be "wordy and full of holes" while also noting that the "rambling style used by Orson Welles has occasional flashes of imagination, particularly in the tricky backgrounds he uses to unfold the yarn, but effects, while good on their own, are distracting to the murder plot." Bosley Crowther of The New York Times similarly found the murder plot to be a "thoroughly confused and baffling thing. Tension is recklessly permitted to drain off in a sieve of tangled plot and in a lengthy court-room argument which has little save a few visual stunts. As producer of the picture, Mr. Welles might better have fired himself—as author, that is—and hired somebody to give Mr. Welles, director, a better script." Alternatively, Time wrote that the "big trick in this picture was to divert a head-on collision of at least six plots, and make of it a smooth-flowing, six-lane whodunit. Orson brings the trick off." Harrison's Reports felt "the action, at times, is confusing, but it seems as if the confusion was purposeful. Some of the photographic effects with their lights and shadows are highly ingenious; they enhance the effect of the action, whether dramatic or melodramatic."

Among retrospective reviews, Time Out Film Guide states that Welles simply didn't care enough to make the narrative seamless: "the principal pleasure of The Lady from Shanghai is its tongue-in-cheek approach to story-telling." One recent book on film noir praises the film for its pervasive atmosphere of malaise and its impressive, extraordinary technical mastery. David Kehr has subsequently declared the film as a masterpiece, with him calling it "the weirdest great movie ever made."

In the British Film Institute's 2012 Sight & Sound poll, six critics each ranked it one of the 10 greatest films of all time. Review aggregator Rotten Tomatoes reports the film has an 84% approval rating based on 51 reviews, with an average rating of 8.1/10. The site's critics consensus reads: "Energetic and inventive, The Lady from Shanghai overcomes its script deficiencies with some of Orson Welles' brilliantly conceived set pieces."

Preservation
The Lady from Shanghai was preserved by the Academy Film Archive, in conjunction with Sony Pictures, in 2000.

In popular culture
 In the 1984 Sergio Leone film Once Upon a Time in America, Robert DeNiro's character Noodles hides out in a Chinese theatre, a front for an opium den, alluding to a scene in which Orson Welles' character hides out in a Chinese theatre to evade the law.
 In the 1989 movie Ghostbusters II (1989), Rick Moranis, Annie Potts, and Sigourney Weaver's characters are watching The Lady from Shanghai on the TV in Bill Murray's character's apartment. Moranis and Potts were discussing the relationship between Welles and Hayworth. 
 The Woody Allen film Manhattan Murder Mystery (1993), a comedy film noir, features a tribute to the film, with its climactic gun battle being set in a cinema behind the screen while it is projecting the shoot-out from The Lady from Shanghai.
 In the 1998 Farrelly brothers comedy, There's Something About Mary, the character of Tucker appears to be based on Arthur Bannister, played by Everett Sloane.
 In the Jim Jarmusch film The Limits of Control (2009), Tilda Swinton's character says that the movie makes no sense.

Hall of mirrors sequence
The climactic hall of mirrors sequence has entered the narrative of cinema as a trope, replicated countless times in both film and television. Examples include:
 The 1965 television episode of The Avengers entitled "Too Many Christmas Trees", and broadcast on Christmas Day in the UK, features Steed (Patrick Macnee) and Mrs. Peel (Diana Rigg) confronting their nemesis in a hall of mirrors shoot-out.
 In the 1970 television episode of Randall and Hopkirk (Deceased) entitled "Vendetta for a Dead Man", Eric Jansen (George Sewell) menaces Jeannie Hopkirk (Annette Andre) in a hall of mirrors.
 In the 1973 Robert Clouse film Enter the Dragon, Bruce Lee's character fights the villain Mr. Han in a hall of mirrors.
 In the 1974 James Bond film The Man with the Golden Gun, Bond and the villain, Francisco Scaramanga, have a climactic shootout in a hall of mirrors.
 The 1989 MacGyver episode "Brainwashed" has a scene involving MacGyver's brainwashed friend, Jack Dalton, shooting at him in a hall of mirrors. Episode writer John Sheppard credited The Lady from Shanghai as an influence.
 In the Batman: The Animated Series cartoon episode "Baby Doll" (1994), Mary Dahl shoots out all the Hall of Mirrors while hiding from Batman.
 In the Chad Stahelski film John Wick: Chapter 2 (2017), Keanu Reeves's character fights the pre-final showdown in a museum's hall of mirrors.

Notes

External links

 
 
 
 
 The Lady from Shanghai at aenigma
 Great Films looks at Lady from Shanghai
 Review of film at Variety
 Review by Jason Mark Scott at Bright Lights Film Journal
 The Lady from Shanghai: If You're Confused, You're Supposed to Be (PostModern Joan)

American drama films
1940s English-language films
1947 drama films
1947 films
Film noir
Films directed by Orson Welles
American black-and-white films
Films set in Acapulco
Films set in New York City
Films set in San Francisco
Films set in the San Francisco Bay Area
Films set on boats
Films shot in Mexico
Films shot in San Francisco
Films based on American novels
Films with screenplays by Orson Welles
Columbia Pictures films
Films with screenplays by Charles Lederer
Films scored by Heinz Roemheld
United States National Film Registry films
1940s American films